The 2014 Emir of Qatar Cup will be the 42nd edition of the cup tournament in men's football. It is played by the 1st and 2nd level divisions of the Qatari football league structure.

The draw for the competition was on 8 April 2014. The competition features all teams from the 2013–14 Qatar Stars League and the top four sides from the Qatargas League. Four venues are to be used – Al Sadd Stadium, Al Arabi Stadium,  Qatar SC Stadium and Khalifa Stadium.

The cup winner is guaranteed a place in the 2015 AFC Champions League.

Round one
Four teams from the 2nd Division enter this round, the winners qualify for round two.

Round two

Round three

Quarter finals

Semi finals

Final

References

Football competitions in Qatar